KOSW-LP (91.3 FM) is an American radio station broadcasting a Variety format. It is licensed to Ocean Shores, Washington, United States.  The station is owned by City of Ocean Shores.

KOSW-LP, FM 91.3 began operation in July 2004 as a non-profit organization by volunteers of the Ocean Shores, Washington community, The station's mission was to inform the residents of Ocean Shores and visitors of events and other need-to-know information including  evacuation instructions in the event of an emergency. It is now owned by the city of Ocean Shores and operated as a public service to all the North Beach area communities.

The station continues to be staffed entirely by volunteers. Its programming features virtually every musical genre including "oldies", classic rock, big bands, jazz, country/western, classical, opera, talk and Celtic. Its DJs play music as well as disseminate Public Service Announcements, donor promotional spots and do live remote broadcasts for community events.

All programming is streamed live 24/7 over the Internet which can be accessed at the station's website, http://koswradio.com.

See also
List of community radio stations in the United States

References

External links
 

OSW-LP
OSW-LP
Community radio stations in the United States
Radio stations established in 2004